The 2013 UEFA Women's Championship, commonly referred to as Women's Euro 2013, was the 11th European Championship for women's national football teams organised by UEFA. The final tournament, held in Sweden from 10 to 28 July 2013, became the most-watched in the history of the Women's Euros. It concluded with Germany, the defending champions, winning their sixth consecutive and eighth overall Women's Euro title after defeating Norway in the final.

Sweden were selected as hosts by UEFA's Executive Committee in 2010, meaning their team automatically qualified for the final tournament. The other eleven finalists were decided by a qualifying competition, featuring 44 teams, staged between March 2011 to October 2012. It was the last time the finals featured twelve teams, as from 2017 onwards they will be expanded to include sixteen teams.

Host selection
Sweden was awarded the hosting of the tournament on 4 October 2010 at a meeting of the UEFA Executive Committee in Minsk, Belarus. The only rival host bid came from the Netherlands. Several other European national associations, including Switzerland, Bulgaria and Poland, had shown interest in staging the tournament but did not submit final applications. Sweden had previously co-hosted the tournament in 1997.

Qualification

A total of 44 teams entered the qualification process to compete for the eleven available places in the final tournament, alongside host nation Sweden, who qualified automatically. Six teams were firstly eliminated during an eight-team preliminary round staged in Macedonia and Malta on 3–8 March 2011.

On 14 March 2011 38 teams – the 36 top-ranked nations (according to their UEFA coefficient) and the two teams advancing from the preliminary round – were then drawn into seven qualifying groups at a draw in Nyon, Switzerland. Matches in these qualifying groups began in September 2011 and concluded a year later. The seven group winners automatically qualified for the final tournament along with the best-ranked runners-up. The remaining six runners-up entered into two-legged play-offs held in October 2012 to determine the final line-up. The following twelve teams participated in the final tournament:

Venues
The tournament was staged at seven venues in seven different towns with each group being staged at two different venues. At some venues, the capacity was reduced during the championship.

Final draw
The final draw for the tournament group stage took place on 9 November 2012 at the Swedish Exhibition & Congress Centre in Gothenburg. The ceremony was conducted by the UEFA General Secretary Gianni Infantino, with the teams drawn out by tournament ambassadors Patrik Andersson and Steffi Jones.

As hosts, Sweden were automatically placed in the top-seeded pot, though they would have been in any case owing to their UEFA coefficient ranking. The eleven qualifiers were placed into the three final draw pots according to their UEFA coefficient ranking. It was decreed in advance the groups into which the three top-seeded teams would be placed.

Seedings

Match officials
Twelve referee trios were announced by the UEFA on 19 June 2013. All officials were based in Jönköping.

Squads

The twelve national teams involved in the tournament were required to register a squad of 23 players by 3 June 2013 at the latest. Only players in these squads were eligible to take part in the tournament.

Results

The final match schedule for the tournament was confirmed on 6 December 2012. All twelve finalists began the tournament at the group stage, with those not eliminated then advancing to the knockout stage.

Group stage
The group winners and runners-up would qualify for the knockout stage, along with the best two third-placed teams; the remaining four teams would be eliminated.
Tie-breaking criteria
If two or more teams were equal on points on completion of the group matches, the following tie-breaking criteria were applied:
 Higher number of points obtained in the matches played between the teams in question;
 Superior goal difference resulting from the matches played between the teams in question;
 Higher number of goals scored in the matches played between the teams in question;
 Superior goal difference in all group matches;
 Higher number of goals scored in all group matches;
 If two teams tie (following the application of tiebreakers 1–5) after having met in their final fixture of the group stage, then their ranking will be determined by penalty shoot-out;
 Position in the UEFA national team coefficient ranking system as at the final draw;

Group A

Group B

Group C

Ranking of third-placed teams
The best two third-placed teams advanced to the knockout stage, with teams being ranked using points as the only criterion. UEFA introduced this principle to avoid teams entering their final matches and "playing on" the previous results, and also to negate the factor of the potentially different strengths of the groups by eliminating goal difference from the calculation. As both Denmark and Russia finished with two points, in accordance with the regulations, UEFA conducted a drawing of lots on 18 July following the completion of the group matches to determine which of these two teams would advance: Denmark was selected and so advanced.

Knockout stage

The eight advancing teams entered the knockout stage to compete in a single-elimination style tournament. In the knockout stage (including the final), if a match was level at the end of 90 minutes, extra time of two periods (15 minutes each) was played. If the score was still level after extra time, the match was decided by a penalty shootout.

All times are local (UTC+2)

Quarter-finals

Semi-finals

Final

Statistics

Goalscorers
5 goals
 Lotta Schelin

3 goals
 Nilla Fischer

2 goals
 
 Mia Brogaard
 Mariann Gajhede Knudsen
 Marie-Laure Delie
 Eugénie Le Sommer
 Louisa Nécib
 Wendie Renard
 Célia Okoyino da Mbabi
 Melania Gabbiadini
 Solveig Gulbrandsen
 Verónica Boquete
 Jennifer Hermoso
 Josefine Öqvist

1 goal
 
 Johanna Rasmussen
 Eniola Aluko
 Laura Bassett
 Toni Duggan
 Annica Sjölund
 Simone Laudehr
 Lena Lotzen
 Dzsenifer Marozsán
 Anja Mittag
 Dagný Brynjarsdóttir
 Margrét Lára Viðarsdóttir
 Ilaria Mauro
 Marit Fiane Christensen
 Ada Hegerberg
 Kristine Wigdahl Hegland
 Ingvild Isaksen
 Nelli Korovkina
 Elena Morozova
 Elena Terekhova
 Alexia Putellas
 Kosovare Asllani
 Marie Hammarström

Own goal
 Raffaella Manieri (playing against Sweden)
 Irene Paredes (playing against Norway)

Awards
UEFA Squad of the Tournament

Golden Boot

Miscellany

Anthem

The official anthem of the tournament was "Winning Ground", composed by Stefan Örn and performed by Swedish pop star Eric Saade. The title of the song was also the slogan of the final tournament. The song was presented on 27 May 2013 at the Friends Arena in an event also featuring Tyresö players Lisa Dahlkvist of Sweden, Denmark's Line Røddik Hansen, Spain's Verónica Boquete and the Netherlands' Kirsten van de Ven.

Tickets
Tickets for the finals were released on 14 February 2013, available to buy via UEFA's online sales portal or from the Ticnet agency in Sweden. The pricing structure was the same for all venues: SEK 200 (approximately €23.50) for Category 1 matches, SEK 150 (≈€17.60) for Category 2 and SEK 100 (≈€11.75) for Category 3. Youth tickets, for those aged up to 16, cost SEK 50 (≈€5.85) for all categories. A so-named Follow Your Team Ticket which gave entrance to all three group matches of a selected team was also sold.

The tournament soon surpassed the previous ticket sales record of 129,000 set in 2009, which prompted the organisers to open up the entire 50,000 seats of the Friends Arena for the final, in contrast to the original plan to place only 30,000 tickets on sale. The final set a new attendance record for a Women's Euros fixture (41,301) and helped bring the total number of tickets sold for the tournaments to 216,888. In addition to attending the matches, the tournament became the first Women's Euros event to feature fan zones where fans could gather together to view matches on big screens.

References and notes

External links

Official technical report

 
2013
UEFA Women's Euro
UEFA Women's Euro
2013 UEFA Women's Euro
UEFA Women's Euro
International sports competitions in Gothenburg
Sports competitions in Linköping
Sports competitions in Kalmar
Sports competitions in Halmstad
Sports competitions in Växjö
Sports competitions in Norrköping
July 2013 sports events in Europe
2010s in Gothenburg
Sports competitions in Solna